Girl from the West is a 1923 American silent Western film directed by Wallace MacDonald and starring Jack Richardson, Juanita Hansen and A. Edward Sutherland.

Cast
 Jack Richardson 
 Juanita Hansen
 A. Edward Sutherland

References

External links
 

1923 films
1923 Western (genre) films
American black-and-white films
Films directed by Wallace MacDonald
Silent American Western (genre) films
1920s English-language films
1920s American films